Kevin Lars Constantine (born  December 27, 1958) is an American ice hockey coach who currently serves as the head coach of the Hungarian hockey club Fehérvár AV19 of the ICE Hockey League (ICE). Constantine has coached hockey teams in the NHL,  WHL, IHL, AHL and numerous major junior hockey leagues. He was also the former head coach of HC Ambri-Piotta in the Swiss National League A. He also coached the North Iowa Huskies for a brief time.

Playing career
Born in International Falls, Minnesota, Constantine was drafted as goaltender by the Montreal Canadiens in the 1978 NHL Draft, and played 34 games of collegiate hockey for Rensselaer Polytechnic Institute in Troy, New York from 1977 to 1980. He left RPI as a junior and finished his degree at the University of Nevada, Reno.

Coaching career
Constantine made a name for himself as a head coach in the late 1980s and early 1990s by guiding the Rochester Mustangs of the USHL and the Kansas City Blades of the IHL to winning records, as well as coaching the 1991 U.S. National Junior team to its (then) best-ever record at the World Junior Championships.  Having found success at lower levels, he was hired as head coach of the San Jose Sharks for the 1993–1994 season: under his guidance, the team set an NHL record for largest improvement by finishing 58 points higher in the standings than it had the previous season.  Between 1993 and 2002, Constantine would coach the Sharks, the Pittsburgh Penguins and the New Jersey Devils,  earning a record of 159–153–66.  He is the only coach in NHL history to take two eighth-seeded teams to first-round Stanley Cup playoff upsets (San Jose over the Detroit Red Wings in 1994 and Pittsburgh over New Jersey in 1999).

In 2001, he founded the Pittsburgh Forge, a new entry in the NAHL.  In two seasons as the team's general manager and co-coach, Constantine amassed a record of 80–24–8 – the Forge won the NAHL regular season championship in 2002.  After the 2002–2003 season, Constantine left Pittsburgh to be hired by the WHL expansion team, the Everett Silvertips, while the Forge relocated to eventually become the present-day Corpus Christi IceRays.  In their first year, the Silvertips broke the record for best season ever by a first-year team in the major junior hockey leagues (the WHL, OHL and QMJHL), winning the U.S. Division Championship—they continued to set records, winning three straight playoff rounds to claim the Western Conference Championship and advance to the WHL Final against the Medicine Hat Tigers, where they lost 4–0.

On May 29, 2007, Constantine was named the head coach of the AHL's Houston Aeros. He quickly turned the performance of the Aeros around, leading them into the playoffs the next two seasons, including a trip to the Western Conference finals in 2009. On April 15, 2010, it was announced that Constantine's contract would not be renewed for the 2010–2011 season, after the Aeros again failed to make the playoffs for various reasons.

He accepted the head coaching job at Ducs d’Angers in France for the 2010-11 season. Two months into the job, Constantine left the club to take over HC Ambrì-Piotta of the Swiss top-flight National League A (NLA). He was removed from his head coaching position in October 2012, but stayed on as the club’s consultant.

On June 13, 2013, Constantine was introduced once again as the head coach of the Everett Silvertips, where he is reunited with the second Silvertips captain, Mitch Love, now an assistant coach.

On June 19, 2017 it was announced that Constantine has been hired as the head coach of the Incheon, South Korean hockey club Daemyung Killer Whales, one of eight teams in the Asia League Ice Hockey (ALIH) which comprises teams from South Korea, Japan and Russia. On November 20, 2020, he was announced the head coach of the Polish team Unia Oświęcim.

NHL coaching record

Awards
Constantine has been the recipient of USA Hockey's Distinguished Achievement Award: USA Hockey is the governing body for amateur ice hockey in the United States, and the award recognizes a U.S. citizen who has made a major contribution to hockey in the United States.

He was a finalist for the 1994 Jack Adams Award for top NHL coach.
 
He won the 1991–1992 Commissioner's Trophy.

Constantine also was awarded the Coach of the Year award by the WHL in 2004.

External links

Kevin Constantine profile

References 

1958 births
American ice hockey coaches
American men's ice hockey goaltenders
Calgary Flames coaches
Everett Silvertips coaches
Ice hockey coaches from Minnesota
Living people
Montreal Canadiens draft picks
New Jersey Devils coaches
People from International Falls, Minnesota
Pittsburgh Penguins coaches
RPI Engineers men's ice hockey players
San Jose Sharks coaches
Ice hockey players from Minnesota